Look to You is the sixth live praise and worship album by Hillsong United. The CD comes with a free DVD which includes documentary footage, interviews and 'behind the scenes'. The album reached No. 30 on the ARIA Albums Chart.

Track listing

Personnel 

 Senior pastors
 Brian and Bobbie Houston

Youth Pastors
 Phil and Lucinda Dooley

 Producers
 Darlene Zschech

 Assistant producers
 Reuben Morgan

 Lead vocals
 Jonathan Douglass
 Holly Dawson
 Tulele Faletolu
 Michelle Fragar

 Backing vocals
 Kirsty Thorntrwaite
 Anneka Kelly
 Sam Knock
 Jay Hoors
 Kylie Fisher
 Mia Fieldes

 Worship leaders/acoustic guitars
 Joel Houston
 Marty Sampson

 Songwriters
 Joel Houston
 Marty Sampson
 Jonathan Douglass
 Mia Fieldes
 Jad Gillies
 Scott Ligertwood
 Matt Crocker
 Rich Mullins

 Cover art
 Outside the City and Buildings, Helicopters
 Cover depicts Joel Houston, Peter James, Marty Sampson, Holly Dawson, Jad Gillies and Matt Tenikoff in the main image

 Musicians

 Electric Guitars
 Marcus Beaumont
 Nathan Taylor
 Jad Gillies
 Marty Sampson

 Keyboards
 Kevin Lee
 Peter James

 Bass
 Matt Tenikoff

 Drums
 Luke Munns
 Rolf Wam Fjell

 Record scratcher
 Duncan Beaumont

 Drum technician
 Sam O' Donell

 Guitar technicians
 Reece Turbin
 Rob Tartos

 Vocal director
 Dee Uluirewa

 Choir
 Hillsong Church Youth Choir

Bonus DVD 

The live DVD contains hidden tracks:

 Japanese conference attendees singing one complete song "One Way". To access, press menu when "What the World Will Never Take" is  playing and select the new option in yellow on the screen.
 A remixed version of "Look to You" created by Hamish McDonald (of Paradyme Studios Australia) accompanied by random visualizations. To access press menu when "What the World Will Never Take" is playing, go to "Song Selection", press enter, highlight "Main Menu", press down then enter.

References 

Hillsong United albums
2005 live albums
2005 video albums
Live video albums

pt:Look to You